Tara Pryor (née Cox) (born 9 January 1971) is an association football player who represented New Zealand.

Cox made her Football Ferns 1–2 loss to Japan on 2 June 2000, and finished her international career with 4 caps to her credit.

Cox's mother Barbara Cox and sister Michele Cox also represented New Zealand.

References

1971 births
Living people
New Zealand women's international footballers
New Zealand women's association footballers
Women's association football midfielders